The 2015–16 Bayer 04 Leverkusen season is the 112th season in the club's football history.

The season was the first since 2004-05 without Simon Rolfes, who retired after the 2014-15 season.

Out on loan

Transfers

In

Out

Competitions

Bundesliga

League table

Results summary

Results by round

Matches

DFB-Pokal

UEFA Champions League

Play-off round

Group stage

UEFA Europa League

Knockout phase

Round of 32

Round of 16

Statistics

Appearances and goals

|-
! colspan=14 style=background:#dcdcdc; text-align:center| Goalkeepers

|-
! colspan=14 style=background:#dcdcdc; text-align:center| Defenders

|-
! colspan=14 style=background:#dcdcdc; text-align:center| Midfielders

|-
! colspan=14 style=background:#dcdcdc; text-align:center| Forwards

|-
! colspan=14 style=background:#dcdcdc; text-align:center| Players transferred out during the season

Goalscorers
This includes all competitive matches.  The list is sorted by shirt number when total goals are equal.

Last updated on 14 May 2016

Assists 
This includes all competitive matches.  The list is sorted by shirt number when total assists are equal.

Last updated on 14 May 2016

References

Bayer 04 Leverkusen seasons
Bayer 04 Leverkusen
Bayer Leverkusen
Bayer Leverkusen